Blacklisted by History: The Untold Story of Senator Joe McCarthy and His Fight Against America's Enemies is a 2007 book by author M. Stanton Evans, who argues that Joseph McCarthy was proper in making accusations of disloyalty, subversion, or treason within the US State Department and the US Army, showing proper regard for evidence (during a period in the late 1940s and 1950s known as McCarthyism or the second Red Scare).

Summary

The book's premise is that a vast Soviet conspiracy infiltrated the Roosevelt and Truman administrations to create a foreign policy that advanced the spread of world Communism, including the Soviet takeover of Eastern Europe and the fall of Nationalist China, which McCarthy exposed, only to have his efforts undermined by political opponents with a vested interest in allowing the conspiracy to continue.

The book exhaustively examines, chronicles, and documents the oft-disputed claim that Communist spies, sympathizers and fellow travelers, who were aided and instigated by the Soviet Union and Communist China, infiltrated the administrations of Franklin D. Roosevelt and Harry S. Truman, to aid in the expansion of Communism throughout the world during the Cold War.

The book's footnotes and the references provide links to the documents located in the National Archives and the records of the Federal Bureau of Investigation, among other sources. Evans documents the fact that the National Archives copy of at least one of the most critical documents McCarthy submitted to the Congressional boards has been ripped out of its binder and stolen by persons unknown. Evans was able to track down another copy in the private papers of one of the Congressmen involved in the hearings. Much of the information that is cited by Evans was previously classified and unavailable to researchers, but it has now been declassified and is now available publicly.

Claims of Communist infiltration and spies within the federal government were further verified by the release of the Venona decrypts and records released by the former Soviet Union's KGB in recent years.

Reviews

Ronald Radosh, a historian and expert on the Cold War spies Julius and Ethel Rosenberg, states that "rather than a biography, Evans has written a defense counsel's brief for his client, whom he seeks to defend against all the slanders made about McCarthy by his political enemies." He praises Evans' "extensive research", and his exposure of the political agendas of McCarthy's main opponents and their unwillingness to look more closely into Soviet penetration. He also commends Evans for correcting the view that all of McCarthy's "victims" were innocent. Radosh severely criticizes McCarthy's failure to distinguish between communists and anti-communist "liberals", and between those expressing communist or pro-communist views and those working as Soviet agents, and criticizes Evans for glossing over this. Radosh concludes

Reviewing the book for The New York Times, American historian David Oshinsky, who also wrote a book on McCarthy in 1983, was harshly critical, calling Evans' primary thesis a "remarkable fantasy," asserting that Evans has uncovered no fresh evidence and arguing that the evidence supports the view that communist spy networks in the United States had largely been dismantled by the time McCarthy started his campaign and that McCarthy was "a bit player in the battle against Communist subversion, a latecomer who turned a vital crusade into a political mud bath... The fiercely negative judgments of those who lived through the McCarthy era are widely accepted today for good reason: they ring true."

Kirkus Reviews called the book "[a] revisionist biography", which, although a "detailed account", is "marred by ideological blinders" and fit "[f]or true believers only", Publishers Weekly described Evans as "given to conspiracy thinking" and Reason magazine described the book as "revisionist" and "a breathless defense of McCarthy."

In a 2008 review by Wes Vernon of Accuracy in Media, he says, "Generally, the media that trashed the Evans book did so either from a wealth of ignorance or willingness to gloss over the book's irrefutable documentation."

References

External links
 Presentation by Evans on Blacklisted by History, November 8, 2007, C-SPAN

2007 non-fiction books
American biographies
Books about American politicians
Espionage in the United States
Works about McCarthyism
Blacklisting
Joseph McCarthy